Hock is a surname. Notable people with the surname include:

Adam Hock (born 1964), American businessman
Christian Hock (born 1970), German footballer and manager
Dee Hock (1929–2022), American businessman
Gareth Hock (born 1983), English rugby league player
Hans Henrich Hock (born 1938), American linguist
Robert Hock (born 1973), German ice hockey player